American singer Madonna has released 14 studio albums, three soundtrack albums, six live albums, seven compilation albums, and 38 other limited releases. Recognized as the world's best-selling female recording artist of all time by the Guinness World Records, Madonna has accumulated a total record sales of more than 300 million units worldwide. In their 2006 press release, the International Federation of the Phonographic Industry (IFPI) confirmed that Madonna's albums alone had sold over 200 million copies worldwide. She is ranked by the RIAA as the best-selling female rock artist of the 20th century and third highest-certified female artist in the United States, with 64.5 million album units. She holds the all-time record for the most number-one albums by a female artist in major music markets such as Australia, Germany, and the United Kingdom.

In 1982, Madonna signed a recording contract with Sire Records, a label owned by Warner Bros. Records. The first release under the label was her self-titled debut album, Madonna (1983). It peaked at number eight on the Billboard 200 and was certified five-time platinum by the RIAA. She followed the debut album with Like a Virgin (1984), which became her first chart-topper in various countries and was certified diamond by the RIAA. Her third studio album, True Blue (1986), reached number one in a record-breaking 28 countries and was once named the best-selling album by a woman of all time by the 1992 edition of Guinness World Records. During 1987, she released two albums that reached platinum status in the United States: the Who's That Girl soundtrack and her first remix compilation, You Can Dance. Madonna's fourth studio album, Like a Prayer (1989), made her the woman with most Billboard 200 number-one albums of the 1980s (second overall, behind only Bruce Springsteen).

Madonna entered the 1990s with the release of I'm Breathless (1990), which contained songs from and inspired by the film Dick Tracy, and her first greatest hits compilation, The Immaculate Collection (1990). The latter became her second diamond-certified album in the US and remains the best-selling compilation album by a solo artist with global sales of over 30 million units. In 1992, Madonna founded her own record label, Maverick Records, as a joint venture with Time Warner. She was paid an advance of $60 million and received 20% royalties from the music proceedings. This was one of the highest rates in the industry at the time, and was only surpassed by Michael Jackson who received 25% royalties. Her next releases under Maverick were the studio albums, Erotica (1992) and Bedtime Stories (1994), as well as Something to Remember (1995), a collection of Madonna ballads. All of them reached multi-platinum status in the US. Madonna scored her best-selling studio album of the decade with Ray of Light (1998), which sold over 16 million copies worldwide.

After charting five albums at number two on the Billboard 200 during the 1990s, Madonna returned to the top of the chart with Music (2000). The album sold over 11 million copies worldwide, of which four million were sold within the first ten days. She continued her chart-topping streak with studio albums American Life (2003) and Confessions on a Dance Floor (2005); the latter became a number-one album in 40 countries with global sales of over 10 million copies. In 2007, Madonna signed a 360 deal with Live Nation for $120 million. Her remaining contract with Warner Bros. ended with her eleventh studio album, Hard Candy (2008), and her career-spanning greatest hits compilation, Celebration (2009). Through her Live Nation partnership, Madonna signed a three-album deal with Interscope Records in 2011. MDNA (2012) was her first release with the label, which marked her fifth studio album to debut at number one on the Billboard 200. It was followed with Rebel Heart (2015) and Madame X (2019), the latter being her ninth chart-topper on the Billboard 200. In 2021, Madonna announced her return to Warner Music Group in a global partnership which grants the label her entire recorded music catalog, including the last three Interscope releases. Under the contract, Madonna will launch a series of catalog reissues beginning in 2022, to commemorate the 40th anniversary of her recording career.

Major releases

Studio albums

Soundtrack albums

Live albums

Compilation albums

Limited releases

See also

 List of artists by number of UK Albums Chart number ones
 List of best-selling music artists in Finland
 List of best-selling Western artists in Japan
 List of highest-certified music artists in Germany
 List of highest-certified music artists in the United States
 List of best-selling albums
 List of best-selling albums of the 21st century
 List of best-selling albums by women
 List of best-selling remix albums
 List of best-selling albums in Argentina
 List of best-selling albums in Australia
 List of best-selling albums in Austria
 List of best-selling albums in Belgium
 List of best-selling albums in Brazil
 List of best-selling albums in Chile
 List of best-selling albums in Europe
 List of best-selling albums in France
 List of best-selling albums in Germany
 List of best-selling albums in Italy
 List of best-selling albums in Mexico
 List of best-selling albums in Turkey
 List of best-selling albums in the United Kingdom
 List of best-selling albums in the United States
 List of diamond-certified albums in Canada

Notes

References

Bibliography

External links

Discographies of American artists
 
Pop music discographies
Albums
Lists of albums by artist